Zapatlela is a 1993 Indian Marathi-language horror comedy film directed by Mahesh Kothare. The film stars an ensemble cast of Laxmikant Berde, Mahesh Kothare, Dilip Prabhavalkar, Pooja Pawar, Kishori Ambiye, Jairam Kulkarni, Bipin Varti and Raghavendra Kadkol. The film was followed by a sequel Zapatlela 2 released 20 years later in 2013.

The film was inspired from the Don Mancini's 1988 Hollywood movie Child's Play. Ramdas Padhye, a ventriloquist and puppeteer created the practical effects involving the evil doll Tatya Vinchu. This film was dubbed in Hindi as Khilona Bana Khalnayak.

Plot 
The film begins in Mumbai with the powerful criminal Tatya Vinchu (Dilip Prabhavalkar) and his henchman Kubdya Khavis (Bipin Varti) approaching the cave of a wizard named Baba Chamatkar (Raghavendra Kadkol) at night in search for Mrutyunjay Mantra (a voodoo spell that can transfer the chanter's soul into a living or non-living object). Upon being threatened by Tatya Vinchu, Baba Chamatkar fearfully gives him out the mantra. CID Inspector Mahesh Jadhav (Mahesh Kothare) is a respected police officer who is working on his attempts at nabbing Tatya Vinchu. On the same night, Mahesh raids his warehouse and gives chase until Tatya Vinchu and Kubdya Khavis hide in a post office. Mahesh finds them over there and shoots down Tatya Vinchu fatally. Before he dies, Tatya Vinchu transfers his soul into a ventriloquism doll lying nearby. Kubdya Khavis is arrested and Mahesh and the police believe that Tatya Vinchu is dead.   

Meanwhile, Mahesh's employer Superintendent Jairam Ghatge (Jairam Kulkarni) gets transferred to the village of Shrirangpur, Maharashtra. His daughter Gauri (Kishori Ambiye) returns to India from the US for pursuing PhD in criminal psychology. Gauri's cousin brother Laxmikant Bolke alias Lakshya (Laxmikant Berde) is a shopkeeper and a talented ventriloquist living with his mother Parubai (Madhu Kambikar) in Shrirangpur. Lakshya's girlfriend is Aavadi (Pooja Pawar) whose father Constable Tukaram (Ravindra Berde) has fixed her marriage when Constable Sakharam (Vijay Chavan) against her wishes.

Through the courier, Gauri sends Lakshya a doll as a gift from the US. The doll happens to be the same one in which Tatya Vinchu's soul is trapped. He reveals to Lakshya that he is not a doll, but Tatya Vinchu. However, Lakshya believes that the doll is battery powered due to the fact that it is made in a foreign country. Later, Lakshya and Parubai's landlord Dhanajirao Dhanavate is insulted when Lakshya publicly makes fun of him via puppetry. He takes all of Lakshya's belongings (including the doll of Tatya Vinchu) from his house under the pretext of unpaid rent.

That night, Lakshya returns home only to find his house completely ransacked by Dhanajirao's aides. He angrily heads off to Dhanajirao's warehouse to avenge his ill-treatment. Meanwhile, Tatya Vinchu slyly reveals his true identity to Dhanajirao who dies of heart failure due to the shock. Just then, Lakshya reaches the warehouse and discovers that Tatya Vinchu has killed Dhanajirao, realising that the doll is indeed a living thing. When Mahesh arrives at the scene, he believes that Lakshya has killed Dhanajirao in a fit of rage and arrests him. 

At the police station, Lakshya desperately tries to explain that the murder was not committed by him, but Tatya Vinchu. However, Mahesh, Gauri and Aavadi believe that he is just trying to fool them to defend himself from this matter. The doll is also kept as evidence. That night, Tatya Vinchu rises out and asks Lakshya the transport of going to Mumbai. Out of fear, Lakshya answers all his questions before Tatya Vinchu leaves for Mumbai. The next day, Dhanajirao's post-mortem reports prove Lakshya innocent and all charges against him are dropped. 

In Mumbai, Tatya Vinchu meets up with Baba Chamatkar and asks him how to transfer his soul back into a mortal human body. The fearful Baba Chamatkar tells him that the way out is transferring his soul into the body of the first person whom he has revealed his true identity, and that person is Lakshya. Tatya Vinchu returns to Shrirangpur. Meanwhile, Mahesh and Gauri confess their love for each other. One night, Tatya Vinchu climbs up to Lakshya's house from the window and attempts to possess his body, but Lakshya manages to lock him up in the cupboard.

The next day, Aavadi takes the doll out from the cupboard and buries it underground for the "satisfaction" of Lakshya. However, Tatya Vinchu manages to come out by digging from inside and chases Lakshya again, much to Lakshya's fear. Tukaram and Sakharam believe Lakshya to be mentally ill and forcefully take him to be admitted to a mental hospital. Gauri takes the doll of Tatya Vinchu to her house. That night, Tatya Vinchu reveals himself to  Gauri and attacks her, but she somehow escapes from him and runs into Mahesh, confessing the truth about the doll to him.

Having gotten the whereabouts of Baba Chamatkar's cave, Mahesh and Gauri approach him and question him about Tatya Vinchu's aliveness. Baba Chamatkar informs Mahesh that the only way to kill Tatya Vinchu is to shoot him between his two eyebrows. Meanwhile, Tatya Vinchu tries to climb up the window of the mental hospital as well to possess Lakshya's body, forcing Lakshya to escape from the mental hospital and return to his house. Tatya Vinchu meets Kubdya Khavis who has escaped from prison. He takes him to Lakshya's house where they both capture Lakshya and Parubai. 

Despite this, Mahesh arrives at the scene on time with Gauri and attempts to capture the criminals. Tatya Vinchu chases Lakshya all the way to the roof and is followed by Mahesh. However, Tatya Vinchu nearly pushes Mahesh down the roof, leaving him hanged on its edge. He further begins to chant the mantra on Lakshya with Aavadi, Gauri, Parubai, Tukaram and Sakharam standing outside the house in concern of their lives. Just as Tatya Vinchu is about to say the last verse, Mahesh manages to get back on the roof and shoots him down between his two eyebrows. The doll falls down the roof, now lifeless. Kubdya Khavis is taken into police custody again.

In the end, Jairam and Tukaram also agree for Mahesh and Lakshya's marriages respectively with Gauri and Aavadi, just as the whole village felicitate the duo for having beaten Tatya Vinchu in his tracks for good. The film ends with the renowned ventriloquist Ramdas Padhye gifting a doll to Lakshya, who screams at Mahesh due to his fear of dolls since the incident of Tatya Vinchu.

Cast 
 Laxmikant Berde as Laxmikant Bolke alias Lakshya
 Mahesh Kothare as CID Inspector Mahesh Jadhav
 Dilip Prabhavalkar in a special appearance as Tatya Vinchu (also voice-over)
 Pooja Pawar as Aavadi (Lakshya's love interest) 
 Kishori Ambiye as Gauri Ghatge (Mahesh's love interest) 
 Jairam Kulkarni as Superintendent Jairam Ghatge (Gauri's father) 
 Bipin Varti as Kubdya Khavis (Tatya Vinchu's henchman) 
 Raghavendra Kadkol as Baba Chamatkar
 Madhu Kambikar as Parubai Bolke (Lakshya's mother) 
 Ravindra Berde as Constable Tukaram (Aavadi's father)
 Vijay Chavan as Constable Sakharam (Aavadi's fiancée)
 Ramdas Padhye as himself at the ending scene

Production

Inspired by
This film was inspired from the 1988 Hollywood movie Child's Play, a film by Don Macini. It was a horror film. As in Zapatlela, it opens with a serial killer (Charles Lee Ray) transferring his soul into a doll, Chucky  after being shot dead by a police officer, and is given to a child, Andy Barclay, who is not believed to when he claims that the doll is alive. Chucky goes to meet his old voodoo master John in a similar manner Tatya confronts Baba Chamatkar and learns that the only way to become human again is transferring his soul into the body of the first person he told his true name to, who happens to be Andy, which puts him in the same danger Lakshya is subjected to by the living doll. Tatya is also shot dead by the same police officer that originally killed his human self after the cop was instructed by John that Chucky's weakness is his heart, just like how Baba does by telling Mahesh to shoot Tatya between his eyebrows to kill him.

Writing
Mahesh Kothare said he wrote the story of Zapatlela in a hotel room in a week. Name of the main antagonist, notorious gangster Tatya Vinchu, Kothare developed from the amalgamation of his make-up man's name 'Tatya' and ' Red Scorpion', which he seen in his childhood.

The puppets
Evil doll Tatya Vinchu and Laxya's naughtiest dall Ardhvat rao are made and operated by Ramdas Padhye, a ventriloquist.  The voice of Ardhvat rao was dubbed by Ramdas Padhye. Dilip Prabhavalkar dubbed the voice of Tatya Vinchu doll.

Sound design
Due to the events that take place in the film, sound effects were much more advanced than in the previous Mahesh Kothare Films. The sound designer and co-supervising sound editor had perfectly mixed the sound to create the desired horror sound effects.

Sequel
A sequel to the film, titled Zapatlela 2, was released in 3D on 7 June 2013 with Adinath Kothare and Sonalee Kulkarni in the lead roles. It also features Makarand Anaspure, Sai Tamhankar, Mahesh Kothare, Madhu Kambikar and Vishakha Subhedar in supporting roles. This film got mediocre success.
In 2017 Mahesh Kothare announced that he is going to make 'Zapatlela 3'.

Reception
After theatrical release Zapatlela became huge hit. It is a popular film in Maharashtra.

Remakes
The film was remade in Telugu in the year 2001, with the title Ammo Bomma, with Rajendra Prasad playing the lead role.

References

External links 
 
 Zapatlela 2 at Gomolo.com

1993 films
1990s comedy horror films
Indian comedy horror films
Marathi films remade in other languages
Films directed by Mahesh Kothare
1990s Marathi-language films